La Voz de un Ángel (Voice of An Angel), is Yuridia's debut album. La Voz de un Ángel was released in 2005, after the finale of La Academia, the Mexican reality show that the artist participated in. The album contains 15 songs interpreted by Yuridia during the series of concerts in the show, in which she was voted second place. The album has had the highest sales for a Mexican album in many years.

Singles
"Ángel"
"Maldita Primavera"

Chart performance
The album was released in October 2005, and quickly rose in the charts. The album debuted at 15 in the Mexican Top 100 albums, and in a few weeks was at the top of the chart. La Voz de un Ángel stayed at number 1 for more than 3 months and is still in the Top 20 Mexican albums.

The first single from the album was a Spanish cover of Robbie Williams' song "Ángel", which became her biggest hit, and her most famous song to date. As of May 2009, the album is still inside the Top 100 Mexican albums, totaling more than 125 weeks.

Track listing

Certifications

References

Yuridia albums
2005 debut albums